Two human polls make up the 2015–16 NCAA Division I women's basketball rankings, the AP Poll and the Coaches Poll, in addition to various publications' preseason polls.

Notable events

Duke dropped out of the top 25 in the AP Poll released 18 January 2016. They had been in the top 25 for the prior 312 consecutive weeks, starting with 29 November 1999 (17 seasons). The 312 week run is the third longest streak in history.

Legend

AP Poll
This poll is compiled by sportswriters across the nation. In Division I men's and women's college basketball, the AP Poll is largely just a tool to compare schools throughout the season and spark debate, as it has no bearing on postseason play.

Sources:

This marks the 40th year of the AP poll which was started in November 1976. Tennessee was not in the initial poll but made the final season poll in the first year and every subsequent year until this year. Texas now has 500 appearances in the poll, joining Tennessee and Georgia with this distinction.

USA Today Coaches Poll
The Coaches Poll is the second oldest poll still in use after the AP Poll. It is compiled by a rotating group of 32 college Division I head coaches. The Poll operates by Borda count. Each voting member ranks teams from 1 to 25. Each team then receives points for their ranking in reverse order: Number 1 earns 25 points, number 2 earns 24 points, and so forth. The points are then combined and the team with the highest points is then ranked #1; second highest is ranked #2 and so forth. Only the top 25 teams with points are ranked, with teams receiving first place votes noted the quantity next to their name. The maximum points a single team can receive is 800.

Sources:

See also
 2015–16 NCAA Division I men's basketball rankings

References

College women's basketball rankings in the United States